Aashiqui: True Love is a 2015 romantic drama film directed by Ashok Pati and produced by Jaaz Multimedia and UK Film Production company Filmbazar Limited. The film stars Ankush Hazra and Nusrat Faria Mazhar in lead roles, and Moushumi in a supporting role.

It is a remake of Telugu romantic film Ishq. The working title was Premi O Premi. It was shot entirely in the United Kingdom. It was released on 18 September 2015.

Cast
 Ankush Hazra as Rahul
 Nusrat Faria as Shruti
 Arindam Dutta as Joy
 Moushumi as Arpita
 Rajatava Dutta
 Sourav Das
 Rebeka Rouf
 Cali Nelle as Bosco

Soundtrack

References

External links
 

2010s Bengali-language films
2015 films
Bengali-language Indian films
Bengali-language Bangladeshi films
Bengali remakes of Telugu films
Films scored by Savvy Gupta
Jaaz Multimedia films
Films directed by Ashok Pati